Campagne-lès-Boulonnais is a commune in the Pas-de-Calais department in the Hauts-de-France region of France.

Geography
A village situated some 16 miles (25 km) southeast of Boulogne-sur-Mer on the D92 road.

Population

See also
Communes of the Pas-de-Calais department

References

Campagnelesboulonnais
Artois